Sharikabad (also Romanized as Sharīkābād; also known as Sharīkābād-e Rīgān and Sharīkābād Rīgān) is a village in Rigan Rural District, in the Central District of Rigan County, Kerman Province, Iran. At the 2006 census, its population was 620, in 146 families.

References 

Populated places in Rigan County